The Ernst von Siemens Music Prize (short: Siemens Music Prize) is an annual music prize given by the Bayerische Akademie der Schönen Künste (Bavarian Academy of Fine Arts) on behalf of the Ernst von Siemens Musikstiftung (Ernst von Siemens Music Foundation), established in 1972. The foundation was established by Ernst von Siemens (1903–1990) and promotes contemporary music. The prize honors a composer, performer, or musicologist who has made a distinguished contribution to the world of music. In addition to the main prize, other prizes are also given. The total prize money given is currently 3.5 million euros, with the winner of the main prize receiving €250,000. The prize is sometimes known as "the Nobel Prize of music".

Smaller awards are called "Förderpreis" (encouragement award). "Komponisten-Förderpreise" ("Composers' Prizes") are given to young composers for one of their works. "Förderprojekte" ("Grant-in-Aid Projects") support music festivals, concerts, musical institutions, and young musicians.

Main prize winners
Winners of the main prize were:

1974 – Benjamin Britten
1975 – Olivier Messiaen
1976 – Mstislav Rostropovich
1977 – Herbert von Karajan
1978 – Rudolf Serkin
1979 – Pierre Boulez
1980 – Dietrich Fischer-Dieskau
1981 – Elliott Carter
1982 – Gidon Kremer
1983 – Witold Lutosławski
1984 – Yehudi Menuhin
1985 – Andrés Segovia
1986 – Karlheinz Stockhausen
1987 – Leonard Bernstein
1988 – Peter Schreier
1989 – Luciano Berio
1990 – Hans Werner Henze
1991 – Heinz Holliger
1992 – H. C. Robbins Landon
1993 – György Ligeti
1994 – Claudio Abbado
1995 – Sir Harrison Birtwistle
1996 – Maurizio Pollini
1997 – Helmut Lachenmann
1998 – György Kurtág
1999 – Arditti Quartet
2000 – Mauricio Kagel
2001 – Reinhold Brinkmann
2002 – Nikolaus Harnoncourt
2003 – Wolfgang Rihm
2004 – Alfred Brendel
2005 – Henri Dutilleux
2006 – Daniel Barenboim
2007 – Brian Ferneyhough
2008 – Anne-Sophie Mutter
2009 – Klaus Huber
2010 – Michael Gielen
2011 – Aribert Reimann
2012 – Friedrich Cerha
2013 – Mariss Jansons
2014 – Peter Gülke
2015 – Christoph Eschenbach
2016 – Per Nørgård
2017 – Pierre-Laurent Aimard
2018 – Beat Furrer
2019 – Rebecca Saunders
2020 – Tabea Zimmermann
2021 – Georges Aperghis
2022 – Olga Neuwirth
2023 – George Benjamin

Composers' Prize winners
Winners of the Composers' Prize (Förderpreis) were:

 1990 – Michael Jarrell and George Lopez
 1991 – Herbert Willi
 1992 – Beat Furrer and Benedict Mason
 1993 – Sylvia Fomina and Param Vir
 1994 – Hans-Jürgen von Bose, Marc-André Dalbavie and Luca Francesconi
 1995 – Gerd Kühr and Philippe Hurel
 1996 – Volker Nickel and Rebecca Saunders
 1997 – Moritz Eggert and Mauricio Sotelo
 1998 – Antoine Bonnet and Claus-Steffen Mahnkopf
 1999 – Thomas Adès and Olga Neuwirth
 2000 – Hanspeter Kyburz, Augusta Read Thomas and Andrea Lorenzo Scartazzini
 2001 – Isabel Mundry, André Werner and José María Sánchez-Verdú
 2002 – Mark Andre, Jan Müller-Wieland and Charlotte Seither
 2003 – Chaya Czernowin, Christian Jost and Jörg Widmann
 2004 – Fabien Lévy, Johannes Maria Staud and Enno Poppe
 2005 – Sebastian Claren, Philipp Maintz and Michel van der Aa
 2006 – Jens Joneleit, Alexander Muno and Athanasia Tzanou
 2007 – Vykintas Baltakas and Markus Hechtle
 2008 – Dieter Ammann, Márton Illés and Wolfram Schurig
 2009 – Francesco Filidei, Miroslav Srnka and Lin Yang
 2010 – Pierluigi Billone, Arnulf Herrmann, Oliver Schneller
 2011 – Steven Daverson, Hèctor Parra, Hans Thomalla
 2012 – Luke Bedford, Zeynep Gedizlioğlu, Ulrich Alexander Kreppein
 2013 – David Philip Hefti, Samy Moussa, Marko Nikodijevic
 2014 – Simone Movio, Brigitta Muntendorf, Luis Codera Puzo
 2015 – Birke J. Bertelsmeier, Mark Barden, Christian Mason
 2016 – Milica Djordjevic, David Hudry, Gordon Kampe
 2017 – , Simon Steen-Andersen, Lisa Streich
 2018 – , Timothy McCormack, Oriol Saladrigues
 2019 – Annesley Black, Ann Cleare, Mithatcan Öcal
 2020 – Catherine Lamb, Francesca Verunelli, Samir Amarouch
 2021 – , Mirela Ivičević, Yair Klartag
 2022 – Benjamin Attahir, Naomi Pinnock, Mikel Urquiza
 2023 – Sara Glojnarić, Alex Paxton, Eric Wubbels

References

Further reading

External links

German music awards
Classical music awards
Awards established in 1972